Sanglorians are an American rock band from Echo Park, California.
Sanglorians were formed in 2011 by lead singer/songwriter Daniel Brummel along with guitarist Jonathan Gomez, bassist Jeremy Keeler, keyboardist/trumpeter Ihui Wu, violinist Morgan Paros and drummer Matt Mayhall (who has since been replaced by current drummer Jon Oswald). Their debut album Initiation was released in October 2013.

Band members 
Current
 Daniel Brummel – lead vocals, guitars
 Jonathan Gomez - guitars
 Jeremy Keeler - bass, backing vocals
 Jon Oswald - drums
 Morgan Paros - violin, vocals
 Ihui Wu - keyboards, trumpet, backing vocals
Former
 Matt Mayhall – drums (2011–2013)
 Andrew Lessman - drums (2013)

Discography

 Initiation (2013)
 Odalisque (2020)

Notes

External links 
 Sanglorians Official Website
 Sanglorians Facebook
 Sanglorians Bandcamp

American power pop groups
Progressive rock musical groups from California
Musical groups from Los Angeles
Musical groups established in 2011
2011 establishments in California